Pinkuylluna or Pinkulluna (Quechua, Hispanicized spellings Pincuylluna, Pinculluna) is an archaeological site on a mountain of the same name in Peru located in the Cusco Region, Urubamba Province, Ollantaytambo District. It is situated between the rivers Patakancha (Patacancha) and Willkanuta, northeast of the town Ollantaytambo.

Gallery

See also 

 List of archaeological sites in Peru

References and notes 

Archaeological sites in Peru
Mountains of Peru
Archaeological sites in Cusco Region
Inca
Mountains of Cusco Region